Nick Friedman, born in 1981, is an American entrepreneur best known for co-founding College Hunks Hauling Junk and College Hunks Moving with his lifelong friend and business partner, Omar Soliman. He co-authored "Effortless Entrepreneur, Work Smart, Play Hard, Make Millions" with Soliman. Friedman is also a TV personality who has appeared on multiple TV shows, a public speaker, and a co-executive producer of the documentary, "Beware of Mr. Baker."

Early life
Nick Friedman grew up in Washington, D.C. Area where he attended the Sidwell Friends School.  Following graduation in 2000, he attended Pomona College in California where he played basketball for four years.

Career
After graduating from college, Friedman worked briefly as an economic research analyst for Marsh and McLennan Companies, Inc. In summer 2002, before senior year in college, he joined Omar Soliman to haul junk in their community to earn extra money. Initially, they used to haul junk from houses, offices and different entities in Omar's mother's cargo van. He quit employment to pursue entrepreneurship at College Hunks Hauling Junk with Omar Soliman, a business they had founded while in college. The term H.U.N.K.S from the name 'College Hunks Hauling Junk', is an acronym for Honest, Uniformed, Nice, Knowledgeable, Students.

He is a contributing writer on the Huffington Post Blog.

Organizations
Nick Friedman is a board member of the Entrepreneur's Organization (EO) and the Young Presidents Organization (YPO). He is also a founding member of the Youth Entrepreneur Council.

In 2015, Friedman joined the Florida chapter of YPO and also partnered with a national non-profit organization named 'Feeding Children Everywhere'.

Awards and recognition
In 2008, Friedman was listed by Inc. Magazine as one of the "Top 30 Entrepreneurs Under 30".

Nick Friedman and his partner were among the 2018 winners of the Ernst & Young Entrepreneur of the Year Florida Award.

At the age of 22, Friedman and his friend became the youngest franchisors in the U.S.

Public Speaking 
Friedman has appeared at TCU as a thought leader where he talked to Neely School students, faculty, staff and the DFW community about innovation. He was a guest speaker at the Startup Grind where he talked about his journey from being a school kid to being a "trash-man".

He also appeared on the Suncoast Business Forum as a guest and talked about College Hunk's journey from scratch to what it is at present. Friedman is also a speaker at CCW.

Television
Friedman has appeared on the following television programs: ABC's Shark Tank, Bravo's Millionaire Matchmaker, The Nate Berkus Show, FOX Business News, The Dylan Ratigan Show, House Hunters, and Undercover Boss.

Filmography

References

21st-century American businesspeople
Living people
1981 births
Pomona College alumni